R Doradus (HD 29712 or P Doradus) is a red giant variable star in the far-southern constellation Dorado.

Variability 

The visible magnitude of R Doradus varies between 4.8 and 6.6, which means it is usually visible to the naked eye, but in the infrared it is one of the brightest stars in the sky.  With a near-infrared J band magnitude of −2.6, only Betelgeuse at −2.9 is brighter.  In the infrared K band, it is sometimes the brightest star in the sky, although usually Betelgeuse is brighter.

It is classified as a semiregular variable star of type SRb, indicating giants with slow poorly-defined variations, often alternating between periodic and irregular brightness changes.  Some studies show it alternating between periods of about 175 and 332 days, and a period of 117.3 days has also been identified.  It has been likened to a Mira variable when its variations are relatively regular, although its amplitude of only 1.5 magnitudes is smaller than Mira variables.

Angular diameter 
The angular diameter of R Doradus is easily measured using interferometry.

The angular diameter of R Doradus is larger than any other measured star other than the Sun.

Properties 

It is on the asymptotic giant branch having exhausted its core helium.

The radius of  means that the diameter of R Doradus is 415 million km. If placed at the centre of the Solar System, the perihelion of Mars would be within the star.

It is calculated to take  to rotate once on its axis.

References

External links
 Swinburne Astronomy Online; information about R Doradus
 Variáveis Binoculares
 The 3µ spectrum of R Doradus observed with the ISO-SWS

Dorado (constellation)
M-type giants
Mira variables
Doradus, P
Doradus, R
029712
1492
CD-62 00175
021479
J04364544-6204379
Emission-line stars